Turbinicarpus valdezianus is a species of plant in the family Cactaceae.

It is endemic to Coahuila and San Luis Potosí states of northeastern Mexico.

Its natural habitat is hot deserts.

It is threatened by habitat loss.

References

Sources

External links
 
 
 

valdezianus
Cacti of Mexico
Endemic flora of Mexico
Flora of Coahuila
Flora of San Luis Potosí
Vulnerable plants
Endangered biota of Mexico
Taxonomy articles created by Polbot